John Jørgensen (31 August 1924 – 17 October 1970) was a Danish footballer. He played in three matches for the Denmark national football team in 1955.

References

External links
 

1924 births
1970 deaths
Danish men's footballers
Denmark international footballers
Place of birth missing
Association footballers not categorized by position